Gary Edward Wagner (born June 28, 1940) is an American former professional baseball right-handed pitcher, who played in Major League Baseball (MLB) for the Philadelphia Phillies and Boston Red Sox from  to .

Wagner, a native of Bridgeport, Illinois, graduated from Bridgeport High School. He attended Eastern Illinois University and signed with the Phillies in 1962.

Biography

Wagner was primarily a relief pitcher during his MLB career, with only four starting assignments among his 162 total games pitched. During his rookie campaign with the 1965 Phillies, he made a career-high 59 appearances and earned seven saves. He also set career bests in games won (seven) and lost (seven).

Then, in September, he was traded to the Red Sox, for whom he played until the end of the 1970 season. When 1971 began he was released by the Red Sox. He signed with the Montreal Expos' organization, played for almost two months in their system, then was released again. Boston picked him up in late May and assigned him to Triple-A, but released him again on July 5, ending his professional baseball career. As a major leaguer, Wagner worked in 267 innings pitched, allowing 250 hits and 126 bases on balls; he struck out 174 and was credited with 22 saves. 

Wagner has a wife, Freddie Jean, and three sons, Gary Jr. (b. 1963), Anthony (1966) and Craig (1970). He now resides in Seymour, Indiana, with his wife. He has seven grandchildren and plays golf regularly at Otter Creek Golf Course in Columbus, Indiana.

References

External links

Gary Wagner at SABR (Baseball BioProject)
Gary Wagner at Baseball Almanac

1940 births
Living people
American expatriate baseball players in Canada
Arkansas Travelers players
Bakersfield Bears players
Baseball players from Illinois
Boston Red Sox players
Chattanooga Lookouts players
Dothan Phillies players
Eastern Illinois Panthers baseball players
Eugene Emeralds players
Louisville Colonels (minor league) players
Major League Baseball pitchers
People from Lawrence County, Illinois
Philadelphia Phillies players
San Diego Padres (minor league) players
Winnipeg Whips players